The 1964 All-Big Eight Conference football team consists of American football players chosen by various organizations for All-Big Eight Conference teams for the 1964 NCAA University Division football season.  The selectors for the 1964 season included the Associated Press (AP) and the United Press International (UPI).  Players selected as first-team players by both the AP and UPI are designated in bold.

Offensive selections

Backs
 Gary Lane, Missouri (AP-1, UPI-1)
 Gale Sayers, Kansas (AP-1, UPI-1) (College and Pro Football Halls of Fame)
 Kent McCloughan, Nebraska (AP-1, UPI-1)
 Jim Grisham, Oklahoma (AP-1, UPI-1)
 Bob Churchich, Nebraska (AP-2)
 Bobby Hohn, Nebraska (AP-2)
 Lance Rentzel, Oklahoma (AP-2)
 Walt Garrison, Oklahoma State (AP-2)

Ends
 Tony Jeter, Nebraska (AP-1, UPI-1)
 Freeman White, Nebraska (AP-1, UPI-1)
 Sam Harris, Colorado (AP-2)
 Jim Waller, Missouri (AP-2)

Tackles
 Larry Kramer, Nebraska (AP-1, UPI-1)
 Ralph Neely, Oklahoma (AP-1, UPI-1)
 Stan Irvine, Colorado (AP-2)
 Butch Metcalf, Oklahoma (AP-2)

Guards
 Newt Burton, Oklahoma (AP-1, UPI-1)
 Tom Wyrostek, Missouri (AP-1)
 Bob Brown, Missouri (UPI-1)
 Carl Schreiner, Oklahoma (AP-2)
 Rod Cutsinger, Oklahoma State (AP-2)

Centers
 Larry Sittler, Nebraska (AP-1, UPI-1)
 John Garrett, Oklahoma (AP-2)

Defensive selections

Defensive ends
 Jack Jacobson, Oklahoma State (AP-1, UPI-1)
 Bill Matan, Kansas State (AP-1, UPI-1)
 Rick McCurdy, Oklahoma (AP-2)
 Langston Coleman, Nebraska (AP-2)

Defensive tackles
 John Van Sicklen, Iowa State (AP-1, UPI-1)
 Butch Allison, Missouri (AP-2, UPI-1)
 Brian Schweda, Kansas (AP-1)
 John Strohmeyer, Nebraska (AP-2)

Middle guards
 Carl McAdams, Oklahoma (AP-1, UPI-1)
 Bob Mitts, Kansas State (AP-2, UPI-1)
 Walt Barnes, Nebraska (AP-1)

Linebackers
 Mike Cox, Iowa State (AP-1, UPI-1)
 Steve Sidwell, Colorado (AP-2)
 Mike Kennedy, Nebraska (AP-2)

Defensive backs
 Gus Otto, Missouri (AP-1, UPI-1)
 Tom Vaughn, Iowa State (AP-1, UPI-1)
 Gary Duff, Kansas (AP-1)
 Ken Boston, Missouri (AP-1)
 Johnny Roland, Missouri (AP-2)
 Ted Vactor, Nebraska (AP-2)
 Larry Shields, Oklahoma (AP-2)
 Ted Somerville, Colorado (AP-2)

Key
AP = Associated Press

UPI = United Press International

See also
 1964 College Football All-America Team

References

All-Big Seven Conference football team
All-Big Eight Conference football teams